Mariella Novotny (born Stella Marie Capes, 9 May 1941 – 1 February 1983) was an English socialite and prostitute who was part of Christine Keeler's social circle and mixed extensively with British establishment figures in the events leading up to the Profumo affair.

Novotny was born in Yorkshire in 1941. She married the club owner Horace Dibben in January 1960.

She has been said to have had relationships with John F. Kennedy and Robert Kennedy, and to have worked with MI5.

In the 1989 film Scandal about the Profumo affair, she was portrayed by Britt Ekland.

She died in 1983 of a drug overdose, aged 41.

References 

1942 births
1983 deaths
English female prostitutes